Nizar Ben Nasra (born 2 August 1987) is a retired Tunisian-Austrian football forward and current assistant coach of Al Hilal's U-23 team.

Club career
He made his debut for FK DAC 1904 Dunajská Streda against FK AS Trenčín on 11 August 2013, entering in as a substitute in place of Branislav Obžera.

References

External links

Nizar Ben Nasra at ÖFB

1987 births
Living people
Tunisian footballers
Association football forwards
Slovak Super Liga players
FC Admira Wacker Mödling players
SV Horn players
FC DAC 1904 Dunajská Streda players
EGS Gafsa players
HNK Segesta players
Tunisian expatriate sportspeople in Norway
Tunisian expatriate sportspeople in Lithuania
Tunisian expatriate sportspeople in Slovakia
Tunisian expatriate sportspeople in Austria
Tunisian expatriate sportspeople in Croatia
Expatriate footballers in Croatia
Expatriate footballers in Norway
Expatriate footballers in Lithuania
Expatriate footballers in Slovakia
Expatriate footballers in Austria